The Chukotko-Kamchatkan–Amuric languages form a hypothetical language family including Nivkh and Chukotko-Kamchatkan. A relationship between Chukotko-Kamchatkan and Nivkh was proposed by Michael Fortescue. He theorized that their common ancestor might have been spoken around 4000 years ago. However Glottolog says that the evidence is insufficient to conclude a genealogical relationship between Nivkh and Chukotko-Kamchatkan.

Evidence

Phonological 
Proposed sound correspondences

Some cognates which include a sound change of Nivkh /ə/ and CK /æ/ are: t’əkə ‘edge of sleeping platform’ and CK tæγən 'near the edge of'' and Nivkh ərŋ 'mout of a river' and CK ær 'flow out'.

Lexical 
Proposed Nivkh-Chukotko-Kamchatkan cognates

Morphological 
Chukotko-Kamchatkan and Nivkh have dual/plural distinction, however it has been lost in Chukchi.

Chukotko-Kamchatkan also has a "singulative" ending, and traces of a singulative ending in Nivkh might be seen.

See also
 Algonquian–Wakashan languages
 Paleosiberian languages
 Uralo-Siberian languages

References 

Proposed language families
Nivkh languages
Chukotko-Kamchatkan languages